Julius Vincent Düker (born 4 January 1996) is a German professional footballer who plays as a defensive midfielder for Indian Super League club Chennaiyin.

Career

Eintracht Braunschweig 
Düker joined the U-19 side of Eintracht Braunschweig in 2013 from Acosta Braunschweig. He made his debut one year later for Eintracht Braunschweig II in the Regionalliga Nord. Shortly after, on the eighth matchday of the 2014–15 season, he made his professional debut for the senior team in the 2. Bundesliga, coming on in the 86th minute in a match against SV Sandhausen.

FC Magdeburg 
In June 2016, Düker transferred to 3. Liga club FC Magdeburg.

SC Paderborn 
He joined 2. Bundesliga club SC Paderborn in July 2018. On 31 December 2018, he returned to Eintracht Braunschweig on loan for the remainder of the season.

SV Meppen 
Ahead of the 2019–20 season, he joined SV Meppen. He scored five goals in 43 matches league matches across two seasons for SV Meppen.

TSV Havelse 
On 22 June 2021, he signed with newly promoted 3. Liga side TSV Havelse.

Career statistics

Club

References

External links

1996 births
Living people
Sportspeople from Braunschweig
Association football forwards
German footballers
Eintracht Braunschweig players
Eintracht Braunschweig II players
1. FC Magdeburg players
SC Paderborn 07 players
SV Meppen players
TSV Havelse players
Chennaiyin FC players
2. Bundesliga players
3. Liga players
Regionalliga players
Indian Super League players
Footballers from Lower Saxony
German expatriate footballers
Expatriate footballers in India
German expatriate sportspeople in India